Neptali "Boyet" Medina Gonzales II (born August 29, 1954) is a Filipino politician serving as the Representative of Mandaluyong's Lone District since 2019, and previously in the 10th, 11th, 12th, 14th, 15th and 16th Congress. He was also one of the House Deputy Speakers during the entire 18th Congress and has been the House Majority Leader from 2001 to 2004 and again from 2010 to 2016.

Early life and education
Gonzales was born on August 29, 1954, in Mandaluyong, Rizal to former Senate President Neptali Gonzales and Candida Medina-Gonzales. He is their youngest child and only son. He has three sisters, Myrna, Sorohayda, and Rhodora.

He attended the Mandaluyong Elementary School and received his secondary and college education at the Union High School of Manila of the Philippine Christian College (now the Philippine Christian University). He finished his degree in political science at the Far Eastern University (FEU) in 1975 and took up law at the Ateneo de Manila University, where he graduated in 1979.

Career 
Before entering public service, Gonzales was a senior partner of the law firm Gonzales, Batiller, Bilog, and Associates from 1980 to 1995. He also served briefly as a bar reviewer and professor in criminal law and constitutional law at the FEU Institute of Law.

Political career

Gonzales was the first Congressman of Mandaluyong when it was converted into a city in 1995 and separated from what used to be the San Juan-Mandaluyong Congressional District. He was City Mayor of Mandaluyong from 2004 to 2007 and Congressman for the city during the 14th Congress of the Philippines (2007–2010).

In the 10th Congress, he served on eight congressional committees, including the Committee on Rules. In the opening session of the 11th Congress, he was selected as one of the two vice–chairmen of the Committee on Rules, which was then chaired by Majority Leader Mar Roxas of Capiz City. Gonzales became Majority Leader toward the end of the 11th Congress and held the position into the 12th Congress. From 1995 to 2004, he authored 33 bills and was co-author of 92 bills. He was one of two newly elected members of Congress to have the greatest number of bills passed into law.

During his first 9-year period in Congress, Gonzales passed a bill allowing the construction of the City of Mandaluyong Science High School and leading the conversion of the Rizal Technological Colleges into Rizal Technological University. In recognition, the RTU awarded him a PhD in Public Administration (Honoris Causa) in October 2003.

During his three-year term as Mayor of Mandaluyong, Gonzales supported the implementation of improved physical and social infrastructure in Mandaluyong. He also initiated innovations in computerization, social infrastructure and urban renewal. He pushed for improvement in health care in the city by strengthening its only public hospital and empowering all health centers for preventive health care. He instigated fresh initiatives in local fiscal reforms and tax collection. He urged private bodies to support the program of housing for the poor. His administration's partnership with the Gawad Kalinga and the Pasig River Rehabilitation Commission provided adequate housing for more than a thousand families in the city.

Gonzales was Senior Deputy Majority Leader of the 14th Philippine Congress. As such, he was an ex officio member of all House Committees. He was also Senior Vice-Chairman of the Committee on Rules, and headed the caucus of NCR Congressmen. In the 15th and 16th Congress, he was the Majority Floor Leader of the House.

In the 18th Congress, Gonzales was elected to be one of the Deputy Speakers of the House.

Personal life
Gonzales' first wife was Josephine Olivia Francisco, who died in May 2001. They had one daughter, Kristine Olivia. In December 2002, Gonzales married Alexandria Pahati, a television reporter, with whom he had twins, Neptali III and Isabel Candida.

References

|-

|-

|-

|-

|-

1954 births
Living people
20th-century Filipino lawyers
Filipino evangelicals
Mayors of Mandaluyong
Members of the House of Representatives of the Philippines from Mandaluyong
Majority leaders of the House of Representatives of the Philippines
Philippine Christian University alumni
Far Eastern University alumni
Ateneo de Manila University alumni
Deputy Speakers of the House of Representatives of the Philippines
Liberal Party (Philippines) politicians
PDP–Laban politicians